The 457th Fighter Squadron is a United States Air Force Reserve Command unit, assigned to the 301st Operations Group, 301st Fighter Wing at Naval Air Station Joint Reserve Base Fort Worth, Texas. The squadron flies the Lockheed F-16 Fighting Falcon. If mobilized, the Wing is gained by the Air Combat Command.

The squadron was first activated in 1944 as a long range fighter unit.  It deployed to Iwo Jima in the spring of 1945 and engaged in combat until V-J Day, earning a Distinguished Unit Citation.  It returned to the United States in December 1945 and was inactivated.

The squadron was again activated in 1953 as the 457th Strategic Fighter Squadron.  In 1957, it was transferred from Strategic Air Command to Tactical Air Command as the 467th Fighter-Day Squadron.  The squadron was inactivated in April 1959.

It began its current active period in July 1972, when the regular Air Force transferred three squadrons of Republic F-105 Thunderchiefs to the reserves.

Mission
The 457th Fighter Squadron is part of the only 301st Fighter Wing.  The aircraft of the 457th FS carry the base tail code TX on their F-16s. The tail code carried by 457th TFS aircraft when the NAS JRB Fort Worth was known as Carswell AFB was TF.

History

World War II
Constituted as 457 Fighter Squadron, Single Engine, on 5 October 1944.  Activated on 21 October 1944 at Lakeland Army Airfeild, Florida with North American P-51 Mustangs. Assigned to the 506th Fighter Group. Major Malcolm C. Watters was the unit's first commanding officer. 

February 1945, the 457th moved to the western Pacific Ocean in spring of 1945. Operated from North Field, Iwo Jima, 25 April - 3 December 1945 (air echelon operated from Tinian, 23 March - 11 May 1945). 

Escorted B-29 bombers in raids against Japan, and attacked targets such as enemy airfields, May – August 1945.

Between 1953 and 1959, and again since July 1972, trained for a variety of tactical air missions. Frequently deployed for training exercises, some of them overseas.

Reserve fighter operations
Took part in Operation Deny Flight, enforcing a no-fly zone over Bosnia, in mid-1990s. Participated in training exercises and deployments. Provided resources for Operation Northern Watch (1999–2000), Operation Southern Watch (2001), Operation Noble Eagle (2001–), and Operation Iraqi Freedom (2003–).

Global War on Terror
Since 9/11 units and individual personnel in various career fields have supported a number of missions related to Operation Enduring Freedom, Operation Noble Eagle's homeland defense, and Operation Iraqi Freedom. The 457th FS ended a two-month deployment to Balad Air Base in support of Operation Iraqi Freedom in December 2005.

Lineage
 Constituted as the 457th Fighter Squadron, Single Engine, on 5 October 1944
 Activated on 21 October 1944
 Inactivated on 16 December 1945
 Redesignated 457th Strategic Fighter Squadron on 20 November 1952
 Activated on 20 January 1953
 Redesignated 457th Fighter-Day Squadron on 1 July 1957
 Redesignated 457th Fighter-Bomber Squadron on 1 January 1958
 Redesignated 457th Tactical Fighter Squadron on 1 July 1958
 Inactivated on 1 April 1959
 Activated in the reserve on 8 July 1972
 Redesignated 457th Fighter Squadron on 1 February 1992

Assignments
 506th Fighter Group, 21 October 1944 – 16 December 1945
 506th Strategic Fighter Wing (later 506 Fighter-Day Wing, 506 Fighter-Bomber Wing, 506 Tactical Fighter Wing), 20 January 1953 – 1 April 1959
 506th Tactical Fighter Group, 8 July 1972
 301st Tactical Fighter Wing (later 301 Fighter Wing), 25 March 1973
 301st Operations Group, 1 August 1992 – present

Stations
 Lakeland Army Air Field, Florida, 21 October 1944 – 16 February 1945
 North Field, Iwo Jima, 25 April–3 December 1945
 Air echelon operated from West Field, Tinian, 23 March–11 May 1945
 Camp Anza, California, 15–16 December 1945
 Dow Air Force Base, Maine, 20 January 1953
 Tinker Air Force Base, Oklahoma, 20 March 1955 – 1 April 1959
 Carswell Air Force Base (later Naval Air Station Joint Reserve Base Fort Worth), Texas, 8 July 1972 – present

Aircraft
 North American P-51 Mustang, 1944–1945
 Republic F-84 Thunderjet, 1953–1957
 North American F-100 Super Sabre, 1957–1958
 Republic F-105 Thunderchief, 1972–1982
 McDonnell F-4 Phantom II, 1981–1991
 General Dynamics F-16 Fighting Falcon, 1990–present
Lockheed Martin F-35A, Est 2024

References

Notes
 Explanatory notes

 Citations

Bibliography

 
 
 

457
Military units and formations in Texas
Fighter squadrons of the United States Army Air Forces
Military units and formations established in 1944